55 kDa erythrocyte membrane protein is a protein that in humans is encoded by the MPP1 gene.

Palmitoylated membrane protein 1 is the prototype of a family of membrane-associated proteins termed MAGUKs (membrane-associated guanylate kinase homologs).  MAGUKs interact with the cytoskeleton and regulate cell proliferation, signaling pathways, and intracellular junctions.  Palmitoylated membrane protein 1 contains a conserved sequence, called the SH3 (src homology 3) motif, found in several other proteins that associate with the cytoskeleton and are suspected to play important roles in signal transduction.

References

Further reading